Serge Simard (born 1950) is a Canadian politician in the province of Quebec Simard was elected to represent the riding of Dubuc in the National Assembly of Quebec in the 2008 provincial election. He is a member of the Quebec Liberal Party and the delegate Minister for Natural Resources.

A municipal councillor prior to his election, he was the president for council of the borough of La Baie in the Saguenay region. He was a member of several committees in the city of Saguenay. Prior to his political career, Simard obtained a degree from the Université Laval and worked for several years for the Mouvement Desjardins.

External links
 
 Liberal Party biography 

Living people
Saguenay, Quebec city councillors
Quebec Liberal Party MNAs
Université Laval alumni
1950 births
21st-century Canadian politicians
Members of the Executive Council of Quebec